Mira Shaq  is a Syrian village located in Harem Nahiyah in Harem District, Idlib.  According to the Syria Central Bureau of Statistics (CBS), Mira Shaq had a population of 61 in the 2004 census.

References 

Populated places in Harem District